Shu Chang may refer to:
Shu Chang (footballer) (born 1977), former Chinese footballer
Shu Chang (actress) (born 1987), Chinese actress